Racquetball (Spanish: Ráquetbol), for the 2017 Bolivarian Games was  held from 20 November to 25 November 2017 in Santa Marta, Colombia.

Tournament format
The 2017 Bolivarian Games racquetball competition has two-stages. There is an initial group stage played as a round robin with the results used to seed teams for the medal  round. The group stage begins November 20 for three days followed by the medal round with the finals on November 25. The racquetball venue is Parque Deportivo Bolivarianno.

Participating nations
A total of 8 countries have entered athletes.

Medal table

Medalists

Women’s Singles

Pool A

Pool B

Pool C

Pool D

Medal Round

Men’s Singles

Pool A

Pool B

Pool C

Pool D

Medal Round

Playoffs

Women’s Doubles

Pool A

Pool B

Medal Round

Men’s Doubles

Pool A

Pool B

Medal Round

References

Racquetball
2017 Bolivarian Games
Bolivarian Games
2017 Bolivarian Games